This is a list of career statistics of British tennis player Emma Raducanu. To date, she has won one major title.

Performance timelines

Only main-draw results in WTA Tour, Grand Slam tournaments, Billie Jean King Cup and Olympic Games are included in win–loss records.

Singles
Current through the 2023 BNP Paribas Open.

WTA career finals

Singles: 1 (1 title)

WTA 125 tournament finals

Singles: 1 (1 runner-up)

ITF Circuit finals

Singles: 5 (3 titles, 2 runner-ups)

Head-to-head records

Record against top 10 players
Raducanu's record against players who have been ranked in the top 10. Active players are in boldface.

Record against No. 11–20 players 
Raducanu's record against players who have been ranked world No. 11–20. Active players are in boldface.

  Magda Linette 
  Leylah Fernandez 
  Beatriz Haddad Maia 
  Yanina Wickmayer 
  Markéta Vondroušová 
  Alizé Cornet 
  Petra Martić 
  Liudmila Samsonova 
  Daria Saville

Double bagel matches (6–0, 6–0)

Career Grand Slam statistics

Best Grand Slam tournament results details

WTA Tour career earnings
Current through 20 February 2023

Open Era records

References

External links
 
 
 

Tennis career statistics